Kidlat  ( Lightning) is a 2013 weekly Philippine television drama that broadcast on TV5, which was aired from January 7 to May 3, 2013, replacing Enchanted Garden and was replaced by Cassandra: Warrior Angel. It stars Derek Ramsay and Gene Castro.

Synopsis 
Voltaire was the son of the couple Dulce and Mario. At a young age, he and his mother were assailed by a "perfect storm" where lightning 'struck' Voltaire, but left him unharmed. He discovered he had power afterwards but he kept it from his mother. As he grew, he felt alone because of his secret, but everything changed when he met Lara.

Follow the life of Voltaire, an ordinary person, who acquired a strange power after being hit by lightning from the "perfect storm". Witness the journey of Voltaire as he learns to control and use his power to protect his family and his community from dangerous opponents. Derek Ramsay stars in this thrilling saga of love and resurrection as Kidlat.

Cast and Characters

Main Cast 
 Derek Ramsay as Voltaire Megaton / Kidlat
 Ritz Azul as Josephine "Joey" Palomares
 Nadine Samonte as Lara Martinez
 Baron Geisler as Vincent Megaton Jr. / Diablo
 Wendell Ramos as Rodel / Graba Man

Supporting Cast 
 Chanda Romero as Minerva Megaton
 Niña Jose as Xyra Ignacio
 Shaira Diaz as Francine Gutierrez / Frosta
 Mark Neumann as Francis Gutierrez / Fuego
 Valerie Weigmann as Natasha Thorpe / Enigma
 Paolo Ballesteros as Walter Marasigan / Warla
 Jay Manalo as Mario Palomares / Burak
 Nanette Inventor as Tita Sol
 Lianne Valentin as Cindy
 Lou Veloso as Miguel
 Erika Padilla as Chichi
 Joross Gamboa as Melvin
 Kokoy de Santos as Alvin
 Isabel Rivas as Dulce
 Andrea del Rosario as Priscilla
 Christopher Roxas as Anthony
 Arcel Zulueta as Zack

Special Participation 
 Christopher de Leon as Vincent Megaton Sr. 
 Assunta De Rossi as young Dulce
 Spanky Manikan as Tata Domeng
 BJ Forbes as young Voltaire 
 Sandy Talag as young Lara

Special Finale Participation 
 Eula Caballero as Cassandra

Popular Culture 
After the issue of defending against basher of his former girlfriend, Andrea Torres who allegedly call  by the basher "Retokada (indirect translation of Artificial beauty). Defending her by telling "Wag kang bastos". Popularized by the facebook internet meme page sorsogon luxury hotel in the joke "Wag ka bastos series" (Don't be rude) starring Derek Ramsey kidlat as Anti bastos Man protecting the whole sorsogon against the prime villain in the series cyberbastos-2077(Richard Gutierrez) and Dubog (Chito Miranda) with special participation Gandarra (Vice Ganda), Teddy as (Teddy Corpuz),  and Boy Hotdog (Daniel Padilla)

Marketing 
On December 17, 2012, TV5 unveils its Kidlat billboard on EDSA, but it caused heavy traffic at EDSA, due to Derek's appearance as Kidlat costume.

On January 6, 2013, before Kidlat aired on primetime, TV5 previewed the series by airing its telemovie.

See also 
List of programs aired by TV5 (Philippine TV network)

References

External links 

Filipino superheroes
Philippine drama television series
2013 Philippine television series debuts
2013 Philippine television series endings
Philippine action television series
Philippine fantasy television series
TV5 (Philippine TV network) drama series
Filipino-language television shows